Retro Stefson was an Icelandic alternative/pop-band formed in Reykjavík, active from 2006 to 2016. The band was signed to Vertigo-Berlin/Universal.

Retro Stefson released their debut album Montaña exclusively in Iceland in October 2008 and their second album, Kimbabwe, in October 2010 on Kimi Records. The album also became their European debut in May 2011 on the German subsidiary of Vertigo Records.

Members
The band consisted of:
Unnsteinn Manuel Stefánsson (lead vocals and guitar)
Þórður Jörundsson (guitar)
Logi Pedro Stefánsson (bass guitar)
Jon Ingvi Seljeseth (keyboards)
Þorbjörg Roach Gunnarsdóttir (synthesizer)
Haraldur Ari Stefánsson (backing vocals and percussions)
Gylfi Sigurðsson (drums).
Sveinbjörn Thorarensen (synthesizer)

Discography

Albums

Singles

References

External links
 

Musical groups established in 2006
Icelandic pop music groups
Icelandic electronic music groups
Musical groups from Reykjavík